Conor Francis McDermott (born October 19, 1992) is an American football offensive tackle for the New England Patriots of the National Football League (NFL). He played college football at UCLA, and was drafted by the New England Patriots in the sixth round of the 2017 NFL Draft.

Professional career

New England Patriots
The New England Patriots selected McDermott in the sixth round (211th overall) of the 2017 NFL Draft. He was waived on September 2, 2017.

Buffalo Bills
On September 3, 2017, McDermott was claimed off waivers by the Buffalo Bills.

On October 3, 2019, McDermott was waived by the Bills.

New York Jets
On October 4, 2019, McDermott was claimed off waivers by the New York Jets.

On November 20, 2020, McDermott signed a one-year contract extension with the Jets.

On September 1, 2021, McDermott was placed on injured reserve. He was activated on November 13. In a December 26 game against the Jacksonville Jaguars, McDermott recorded the first touchdown of his career, catching a pass from Zach Wilson to extend the Jets' lead in the game.

On March 9, 2022, McDermott re-signed with the Jets. He was released on October 17 and re-signed to the practice squad.

New England Patriots (second stint)
On November 22, 2022, McDermott was signed by the New England Patriots off the Jets practice squad. He was named the starting right tackle and started the final six games of the season.

On February 22, 2023, McDermott signed a two-year contract extension with the Patriots.

Personal life
His older brother, Kevin McDermott, also played college football at UCLA and is the former starting long snapper for the Minnesota Vikings.

References

External links
UCLA Bruins bio

1992 births
Living people
Players of American football from Nashville, Tennessee
American football offensive tackles
American football offensive guards
UCLA Bruins football players
New England Patriots players
Buffalo Bills players
New York Jets players